Carsen is both a surname and a given name. Notable people with the name include:

Surname
Robert Carsen (born 1954), Canadian opera director
Walter Carsen (1912–2012), Canadian businessman and philanthropist
Walter Carsen Centre, headquarters of the National Ballet of Canada in Toronto, Ontario, Canada

Given name
Carsen Edwards (born 1998), American basketball player
Carsen Germyn (born 1982),  Canadian ice hockey player

See also 
Carson (disambiguation)